Agent J is a 2007 Taiwanese action romance film. It was directed by Jeff Chang, Marlboro Lai, and Kuang Sheng and stars Jolin Tsai, Kim Jae-won, Stephen Fung, and Carl Ng. It is composed of three unrelated chapters about stories between agent J and her three boyfriends.

Plot 
Chapter one

Jolin and S, a pair of lovers, were traveling in Paris, France. S just asked the passers-by nearby for directions, then he turned around and found that Jolin disappeared but he searched frantically nearby in vain. It turned out that Jolin has long been spotted by a secret organization. After the organization kidnapped her, they brainwashed her and trained her as an agent, letting her to perform missions for the organization as J in the future. Her boyfriend S stayed in Paris in the three years after Jolin disappeared, and became a private bodyguard specializing in witness protection. He also wanted to track down the agent J who appeared shortly after his girlfriend disappeared and looks exactly like his girlfriend. This time, J's latest mission was to assassinate the Korean private bodyguard who has been tracking her. She followed him to a rooftop and pulled the trigger mercilessly as usual, but S showed her a smile before dying. The smile made her very confused, so she came to S's apartment with doubts, and discovered her own past.

Chapter two

Jolin was spotted by a secret organization in a prison in London, England, and the organization offered her freedom in exchange for completing an assassination mission. This time, Jolin's assassination target was Blue Beard, but on the other side Blue Beard had already sensed that someone was going to assassinate him, so he also sent his own people to arrest Jolin at the same time. One day, Jolin found herself being followed by two men in black on the street. She got help from a photographer Lu Hsiao-tung while evading, and they fell in love at first sight. During their relationship, Jolin accidentally discovered that Lu Hsiao-tung's real identity was actually a secret agent entrusted by Blue Beard. One night, when Jolin was following Blue Beard, Lu Hsiao-tung unexpectedly appeared in front of Jolin, and the two looked at each other speechlessly. At this moment, Blue Beard suddenly shot Lu Hsiao-tung in the back. Although Jolin finally succeeded in assassinating Blue Beard, Lu Hsiao-tung died on the spot.

Chapter three

Jolin received the latest mission from a secret organization at a train station in Bangkok, Thailand. This time, she had to get close to a gang boss and rescue Vince who is performing an undercover mission, and Vince was her boyfriend who was supposed to be died from a bomb years ago. One day, Jolin turned into a nightclub singer and tried to get close to the boss, and she saw Vince sitting beside him in the box. The identities of the two were exposed by the gang boss, so the two sides started shooting, and Vince got shot in the body. Jolin took Vince back to her apartment and helped him take out the bullet. The two who hadn't seen each other for many years rekindled their love. The next day, Vince sent Jolin away and went to assassinate the gang boss alone. Although the assassination was successful, he got shot in the chest by the gang boss from behind. On the other side, Jolin found that he was also being followed by gang members, so she drove to try to get rid of the gang members, and she informed Vince to meet at the agreed place. Vince dragged his shot body to the agreed place, Jolin beated his body hard to wake him up but was unable to recover.

Cast 
 Jolin Tsai as Agent J
 Kim Jae-won as Bodyguard S
 Stephen Fung as Lu Hsiao-tung
 Carl Ng as Vince

Production 
The film was divided into three chapters, and it was filmed in Paris, London, and Bangkok, which took one month to complete and cost more than NT$33 million.

Soundtrack 

The film was released to accompany Jolin Tsai's 2007 album Agent J, so all the songs appear in the film are from the album. In addition, except for "Neron" which comes from the British label Bruton, all the film scores appear in the film are from KPM Music.

Promotion and release 
On August 27, 2007, EMI released the trailer for the chapter one of the film. On September 3, 2007, EMI released the trailer for the chapter two of the film. On September 4, 2007, EMI released the trailer for the chapter three of the film. On September 5, 2007, EMI held the film preview session in Taipei, Taiwan. On September 13, 2007, EMI released the 12-minute version of the film. On September 14, 2007, EMI held the film premiere in Taipei, Taiwan. On September 20, 2007, EMI premiered the two-minute version of the film in Taipei, Taiwan, and broadcast it on 58 television stations, radio stations, and new media in Taiwan. On September 22, 2007, EMI held a special screening event of the film in Tamsui, Taiwan.

This film was released in conjunction with Jolin Tsai's 2007 album Agent J, so it was not released in movie theaters, but it was completely included in the limited edition of the album released on September 21, 2007.

Critical reception 
Wring for Tom.com, Mi San commented: "The Agent J trilogy contains gimmicks that can make a crowd to watch: men and women agents, bodyguards, foreign gangsters, assassinations, shooting, pole dance, aerial silk acrobatics, human subject research, church, prison, prisoners, lesbians, cars, drug trade, singing and dancing performances, sex scene...a Hollywood blockbuster can't even give that much in one single film. But it's like taking the lyrics out of a song and reciting them as a poem, it's 99.9% ridiculous, if you look at this trilogy as an independent film, it's hard to compliment. The film stocks were all used for the above-mentioned points and to arouse emotions, the close-up of roles and the inner monologue are overflowing, while the necessary temperament shaping and the plot narrative are only briefly illustrated. The rift between music and film is obvious, the album's songs have diverse styles, Jolin Tsai's roles are thus different, the film is eager to unify them, but the lack of transition makes the agent J seem particularly split. And if the album's songs are used as the film soundtrack, it is too overwhelming, in some cases, a string, electronic music, or sound effect that sets off the atmosphere is more appropriate than Jolin Tsai singing herself."

Controversies 
The film was classified as M18 (Mature 18) by the Singapore film rating system, mainly because of the three-second scene of lesbian kissing in the film's second chapter. Chen Xiangyun, the manger of EMI Singapore's Chinese Department, said: "Singapore can broadcast it, unless we allow some scenes to be cut, but every scene can drive the plot, just like Lust, Caution would become very boring if it were cut too cleanly."

Because the word "agent" is a sensitive word, and the content of the film is somewhat pornographic, the film was banned from public broadcasting in China.

The film could not be broadcast publicly in Thailand because of restrictions on broadcasting foreign films on the grounds of "protecting local culture against too popular foreign culture."

References

External links 
 

2000s romantic action films
2007 action films
Films shot in Bangkok
Films shot in London
Films shot in Paris
Taiwanese action films
Taiwanese romance films